As Giro d'Italia is part of UCI ProTour, 20 ProTour teams start the race. Wild cards were given to Ceramica Panaria–Navigare and Selle Italia–Diquigiovanni.

Official start list

Discovery Channel  (DSC)

AG2r Prévoyance  (A2R)

Bouygues Télécom  (BTL)

Caisse d'Epargne–Illes Balears  (CEI)

Ceramica Panaria – Navigare  (PAN)

Cofidis  (COF)

Crédit Agricole  (C.A)

Davitamon–Lotto  (DVL)

(EUL)

Française des Jeux  (FDJ)

Gerolsteiner  (GST)

Lampre–Fondital  (LAM)

Liberty Seguros–Würth  (LSW)

Liquigas  (LIQ)

Phonak Hearing Systems  (PHO)

Quick-Step–Innergetic  (QSI)

Rabobank  (RAB)

Saunier Duval–Prodir  (SDV)

Selle Italia–Serramenti Diquigiovanni  (CLM)

Team CSC  (CSC)

Team Milram  (MRM)

T-Mobile Team  (TMO)

External links 

cyclingnews.com

2006 Giro d'Italia
2006